The Monte Cristo Range of Utah is a  long mountain range in the extreme northeast of the state. It parallels the Bear River Mountains to the west, but is only about half its length.

The range trends north-northeast and also parallels a north-flowing stretch of the Bear River, with Woodruff, Randolph, and Sage Creek Junction on the river's west bank and bordering the eastern Monte Cristo Range foothills.

At the range's center-northwest foothills, in the north of Ant Valley, is the Hardware Ranch Wildlife Management Area. The main, north-northeasterly ridgeline, forms the county boundaries between Cache County, west, and Rich County, east.

Range description
Ant Valley is at its western foothills bordering the Bear River Range, west, and covers about half of the western foothills, from north of the foothills center, and south, to about half of the southwest foothills.

Access
Utah State Route 101 traverses the Bear River Range from Hyrum and accesses the center-west region of the range in Ant Valley, at the Hardware Ranche WMA. Ant Flat Road meets Utah 101, and traverses the southwest of the range, intersecting with Utah 39, which traverses a south region of the range.

References

External links

 Gold Hill (approx range center, (lat-long.com) (coordinates)

Mountain ranges of Cache County, Utah
Mountain ranges of Rich County, Utah
Mountain ranges of Weber County, Utah
Mountain ranges of Utah
Wasatch-Cache National Forest